
Gmina Wodynie is a rural gmina (administrative district) in Siedlce County, Masovian Voivodeship, in east-central Poland.

Villages
Gmina Wodynie contains the villages and settlements of Borki, Brodki, Budy, Czajków, Helenów, Jedlina, Kaczory, Kamieniec, Kochany, Kołodziąż, Łomnica, Młynki, Oleśnica, Ruda Wolińska, Rudnik Duży, Rudnik Mały, Seroczyn, Soćki, Szostek, Toki, Wodynie, Wola Serocka, Wola Wodyńska and Żebraczka.

Neighbouring gminas
Gmina Wodynie is bordered by the gminas of Borowie, Domanice, Latowicz, Mrozy, Skórzec and Stoczek Łukowski.

References

Polish official population figures 2006

Wodynie
Siedlce County